Classical Archives LLC is an online digital music store that solely focuses on classical music.  Originally opening as the Classical MIDI Archives in 1994 primarily as a repository for free MIDI sequences of classical music works, in August 2000 the site incorporated as Classical Archives, LLC, and has since been also offering commercial label recordings for both streaming and downloading. Non-members can stream 60-second samples from any track on the Classical Archives.  For a monthly fee of $7.99 (or $87.89 a year) members are able to stream any track, work, or album in its entirety from the site's catalogue, and receive a discount of 10% on the price of downloads. Both members and non-members can access detailed musicological information for each work: movements, genre, principal instruments, year of composition, and key. Additionally, nearly every composer's biography is provided. Free streaming radio is available for computers and mobile devices that also includes a device to close the connection in one hour, if desired.

Classical Archives uses a proprietary system (called the Contextual Metadata Engine) that allows for the ingestion and cataloguing of all recordings based on musicologically accurate and uniform metadata.  Because of the Contextual Metadata Engine, visitors can search and cross-reference by various relevant criteria: composer, work title, artist, albums, historical period, instrument, and genre, in order to find and compare different recordings.

Classical Archives was founded by CEO Pierre R. Schwob. The cataloguing of the Classical Archives database is carried out by a team of musicologists led by Chief Musicologist and Artistic Director Dr. Nolan Gasser.

File types
The site provides 320kbit/s MP3 files for downloads and 160 kbit/s AAC files for streaming.  Sample clips are streamed at 60kbit/s for non-members.

Database
As of May 22, 2011, the Classical Archives database features 12,046 composers, 42,744 recording artists, and 26,697 Albums from 268 labels. These include the classical catalogues of Universal Music Group (Deutsche Grammophon, Decca, Phillips, ECM, etc.), Sony (RCA, Columbia, etc.), Naxos (BIS, Chandos, Hänssler Classic, etc.), and many independent labels through IODA (harmonia mundi, Nimbus, Summit, etc.).  As of June 2011, the Classical Archives has 904,230 registered members.

Other site features
 Exclusive Interviews: Artistic Director Nolan Gasser has conducted exclusive interviews with international performers and composers including Marin Alsop, American Brass Quintet, Vladimir Ashkenazy, Joshua Bell, Ray Chen, Gloria Coates, John Corigliano, Jeremy Denk, Danielle de Niese, Simone Dinnerstein, JoAnn Falletta, Renee Fleming, David Finckel, Alan Gilbert, Vittorio Grigolo, Hélène Grimaud, Hillary Hahn, Wu Han, Paul Hillier, Daniel Hope, Sharon Isbin, David Lang, Lang Lang, Mark Padmore, Sondra Radvanovsky, Ryuichi Sakamoto, Stile Antico, Trio Mediaeval, Susan Wadsworth, Xiayin Wang, and Eric Whitacre.
 Free One Click Concerts™: A concert length program of selected tracks based on either a special theme, composer, period, or genre.
 Free Classical Archives Internet Radio Stream Broadcast for computers and mobile devices 
 About pages for composers and works. Powered by All Music Guide, biographies and work descriptions provide musicological and historical background.
 Playlists: Members have access to playlists that are created by other members and Classical Archives staff.
 Essentials: For each composer, a list of historically important works is presented.

References

External links
 

Online music stores of the United States